The GippsAero GA10 Airvan, marketed as the Airvan 10, is a 10-seat, turbo prop, single-engined utility aircraft currently being developed by GippsAero (formerly Gippsland Aeronautics) of Victoria, Australia.

Development

Its 20-minute first flight was completed in May 2012. In mid-2015, the aircraft was planned to be certified in 2015, but later in the year no schedule was claimed.
It was certificated by the Australian Civil Aviation Safety Authority on 19 May 2017, as well as the American Federal Aviation Administration.

In January 2018, two GA10s were flying: the prototype and the first production aircraft, which GippsAero hopes to deliver in the second half of 2018.

On 4 June 2018, during flight tests supported by the National Test Pilot School from the Mojave Air & Space Port in southern California, a GA10 crashed in the Mojave Desert.

On 24 August 2018, the first customer for GA10 Airvan was announced to be Major Blue Air, Botswana.
Its unit cost in 2018 was $1.7 Million

Design
After successful development of the eight-seat GA8 Airvan piston-engined aircraft, the design has been stretched and re-engined with a turboprop engine to increase seating and payload capacity, resulting in the GA10. With many piston-engined GA8 aircraft being operated in remote areas, the JetA/JetA1-powered GA10 is intended to appeal to general aviation customers.

The GA10 retains the aerodynamic design of the GA8 and the intent is to retain as many current production parts as possible. A design requirement is for a five-hour endurance with eight occupants (including pilot), and a maximum fuel load of 550 litres. Similarly to the GA8, a STOL kit will be developed for the GA10.

The GA10 should be a capable intelligence, surveillance and reconnaissance (ISR) platform, after the piston GA8, carrying an electro-optical/infrared sensor (EO/IR) ball in a modified underside baggage bay for an unobstructed 360° view.

Specifications

See also

References

External links

 Gippsland Aeronautics Official Site
 

GA10
Single-engined tractor aircraft
2010s Australian civil utility aircraft
Aircraft first flown in 2012